Chopda Assembly constituency is one of the 288 Vidhan Sabha constituencies of Maharashtra state in western India. This constituency is located in the Jalgaon district and it is reserved for the candidates belonging to Scheduled tribes. It is currently held by Jagdishchandra Walvi of the Nationalist Congress Party.

It is part of the Raver Lok Sabha constituency along with another five Vidhan Sabha segments, namely Bhusawal, Jamner, Muktainagar and Raver in Jalgaon district and Malkapur in adjoining Buldhana district.

As per orders of Delimitation of Parliamentary and Assembly constituencies Order, 2008, No. 10 Chopda Assembly constituency is composed of the following: 
1. Chopda Tehsil, 2.Yawal Tehsil (Part), Revenue Circle – Kingaon and Sakali of Jalgaon district.

Members of Legislative Assembly
 1951: Patil Madhavrao Gotto, Indian National Congress
 1962: Deorao Madhavrao Nikam, Indian National Congress
 1967: M.N.Gujarathi, Independent
 1972: Sharadchandrika Suresh Patil, Indian National Congress
 1978: Chaudhary Madhavrao Kautik, Janata Party
 1980: Sharadchandrika Suresh Patil, Indian National Congress (I)
 1985: Arunlal Gowardhandas Gujrathi, Indian National Congress (Socialist)
 1990: Arunlal Gowardhandas Gujrathi, Indian National Congress
 1995: Arunlal Gowardhandas Gujrathi, Indian National Congress
 1999: Arunlal Gowardhandas Gujrathi, Nationalist Congress Party
 2004: Patil Kailas Gorakh, Shiv Sena
 2009: Jagdishchandra Walvi, Nationalist Congress Party
 2014: Chandrakant Baliram Sonawane, Shiv Sena
 2019: Latabai Chandrakant Sonawane, Shiv Sena

Election Results

2019

See also
 Chopda
 List of constituencies of Maharashtra Vidhan Sabha

References

Assembly constituencies of Maharashtra